"It's Alright" is a song by Chanté Moore from her debut album, Precious. It was released on January 23, 1993 as the album's second single. Like the previous single "Love's Taken Over", the song peaked at number 13 on the US Billboard Hot R&B singles chart. A music video was made for the original/remix versions of the song.

Charts

Weekly charts

Year-end charts

References

1993 singles
Contemporary R&B ballads
Soul ballads
Chanté Moore songs
MCA Records singles
1992 songs
Songs written by Chanté Moore
Songs written by Vassal Benford
1990s ballads